Below are the team squads for the Softball at the 2004 Summer Olympics which took place in the Olympic Softball Stadium in the Helliniko Olympic Complex from August 14 to August 23, 2004.

Australia

Canada

China

Chinese Taipei

Greece

Italy

Japan

United States

References

2004
2004